The Primera División de Fútbol Profesional Apertura 2008 season (officially known as "Torneo Apertura 2008"), started on August 2, 2008, and finished on December 21, 2008.

C.D. Luis Ángel Firpo came into the tournament as defending champions, having won their eighth league title in the previous season. A total of 10 teams contested the league, 8 of which had already participated in the Clausura 2008 season, and two of which had been promoted from the Segunda División de Fútbol Salvadoreño.

The 10 teams of the Primera División each played 18 matches, playing each team twice (home and away). The top four teams qualified directly to the semifinals.

The winner of the final series gained entry into the 2009–10 CONCACAF Champions League.

Promotion and relegation
Promoted from Segunda División de Fútbol Salvadoreño as of June 27, 2008.
 Champions: C.D. Atlético Balboa
 Runner-up (won through playoff): Juventud Independiente

Relegated to Segunda División de Fútbol Salvadoreño as of June 27, 2008.
 Last place: Once Municipal
 Second last (lost through playoff): San Salvador F.C.

Team information

Personnel and sponsoring

League standings

Semifinals 1st Leg

Semifinals 2nd Leg

Final

Champion

A.D. Isidro Metapán qualified for 2009–10 CONCACAF Champions League.

Season statistics

Scoring
First goal of the season: Nicolás Muñoz for Alianza against Balboa (2 August 2008)
Fastest goal in a match: 25 seconds – Alejandro de la Cruz Bentos for FAS against Nejapa (26 October 2008)
Goal scored at the latest point in a match: 90+9 minutes
José Oliveira de Souza for Águila against Independiente (23 August 2008)
Widest winning margin: 10 – Águila 10–0 Independiente (23 August 2008)
Most goals in a match: 10
Águila 10–0 Independiente (23 August 2008)
Balboa 3-7 Independiente (30 August 2008)
First hat-trick of the season: José Oliveira de Souza for Águila against Independiente (30 August 2008)
First own goal of the season: Luis Espíndola for Nejapa against Balboa (29 October 2008)
Most goals by one player in a single match: 3
José Oliveira de Souza for Águila against Independiente (30 August 2008)
Most goals by one team in a match: 10
Águila 10–0 Independiente (23 August 2008)
Most goals in one half by one team: 6
Águila 10–0 Independiente (23 August 2008)
Most goals scored by losing team: 3
Balboa 3-7 Independiente (30 August 2008)

Average home attendance
Highest average home attendance: 3,712 (Águila)
Lowest average home attendance: 667 (Nejapa)

Clean sheets
Most clean sheets - Firpo (9)
Fewest clean sheets - Nejapa, Alianza and Independiente (7)

Overall
Most wins - Águila (10)
Fewest wins - Nejapa (2)
Most draws - Balboa (8)
Fewest draws - Águila (4)
Most losses - Nejapa (11)
Fewest losses - Metapán (3)
Most goals scored - Águila (39)
Fewest goals scored - Nejapa (16)
Most goals conceded - Independiente (35)
Fewest goals conceded - Vista Hermosa (16)

Home
Most wins - Águila and Metapán (6)
Fewest wins - Independiente and Alianza (1)
Most draws - Independiente (5)
Fewest draws - Nejapa and Metapán (1)
Most losses - Alianza (4)
Fewest losses - Águila, Metapán, FAS, Chalatenango and Vista Hermosa (1)
Most goals scored - Metapán (24)
Fewest goals scored - Independiente (5)
Most goals conceded - Nejapa (20)
Fewest goals conceded - Águila (6)

Away
Most wins - Águila and FAS (4)
Fewest wins - Nejapa (0)
Most draws - Metapán and Balboa (5)
Fewest draws - Alianza (1)
Most losses - Alianza and Nejapa (5)
Fewest losses - Metapán (2)
Most goals scored - Águila (17)
Fewest goals scored - Nejapa (6)
Most goals conceded - Independiente (25)
Fewest goals conceded - Metapán and Vista Hermosa (9)

Top scorers

Fastest scorers

Attendance

Managerial changes

List of foreign players in the league
This is a list of foreign players in Apertura 2008. The following players:
have played at least one apetura game for the respective club.
have not been capped for the El Salvador national football team on any level, independently from the birthplace

A new rule was introduced this season that clubs can only have three foreign players per club and can only add a new player if there is an injury or player/s is released.

C.D. Águila
  José Oliveira
  Marcelo Messias
  Arturo Albarrán
  Leandro Franco

Alianza F.C.
  Gustavo Méndes
  Francisco Portillo
  Juan Carlos Mosquera
  Nicolás Muñoz

Atlético Balboa
  Alcides Bandera 
  Franklin Webster
  Cristian Mosquera
  Santos Nuñez

Chalatenango
  Jose Luis Osorio
  Manuel Luna
  Hermes Martínez
  Roberto Chanampe
  Julio Manrique
  Ernesto Pezo

C.D. FAS
  Alejandro Bentos
  Osvaldo Mendoza
  Yusuf Sindeh
  Paulo César Rodrigues

 (player released mid season)
 Injury replacement player

Juventud Independiente
  Carlos Escalante
  Lucas Abraham
  Fabricio Da Silva
  Nick ´Pimentel

C.D. Luis Ángel Firpo
  Patricio Barroche
  Edgar Leguizamón
  Leonardo Pekarnik 
  Ramón Ávila

Nejapa FC
  Juan Carlos Reyes
  Luis Espíndola
  Henry Josué Martínez

A.D. Isidro Metapán
  Gabriel Garcete
  Ernesto Noel Aquino
  Paolo Suarez
  Williams Reyes

Vista Hermosa
  Pompilio Cacho Valerio
  Luis Torres Rodríguez
  Elder José Figueroa
  José Francisco Ramírez

References

External links
 http://www.elgrafico.com/index.php?cat=4&std
 https://web.archive.org/web/20070820233416/http://www.laprensagrafica.com/futbol/
 http://www.elsalvador.com/mwedh/deportes/dep_seccion.asp?idCat=6429&opSM=0

Primera División de Fútbol Profesional Apertura seasons
El
1